Henryetta is a city in Okmulgee County, Oklahoma, United States. The population was 5,927 at the 2010 census, down 2.8 percent from the figure of 6,096 recorded in 2000.

History
Hugh Henry established a ranch on Creek Nation land in 1885. He soon found a deposit of coal, which he began using to fuel the forge at his ranch. Discovery of more coal deposits in the large Henryetta Coal Formation attracted several railroads to develop these mines. A settlement named Furrs grew up around the mines. The name changed to Henryetta when a post office opened on August 28, 1900.

At statehood in 1907, Henryetta had 1,051 residents. The economy was based on agriculture, coal, natural gas and oil. In 1909, the area had fourteen coal mines, producing 65,000 tons per month. By 1910, the population had grown to 1,671. The town added a broom factory, several brick factories and a bottling plant during the 1920s.  By the time of the Thirty-sixth annual report of the Department of Mines and Minerals in 1943, combined yearly production by Acme Coal Company, Atlas Coal Company, Ben Hurr Coal Company, Starr Coal Company, and Wardin-Pullen Coal Company-- all of Henryetta-- was over 600,000 tons.

Henryetta's manufacturing base continued to expand. Pittsburgh Plate Glass (PPG) built a plate glass window plant in Henryetta in 1929–30, employing nine hundred people and claiming to be the largest west of the Mississippi River.  The factory closed in 1974, but was purchased and refitted for making glass containers, and continues in operation by Anchor Glass Container.

Eagle-Picher placed a massive zinc smelting facility in the Spelter City area of town, which continued through the 1960’s.  The company also employed more than seven hundred people at its plant that extracted the rare metal germanium.  The plant has since closed and become a Superfund cleanup site.

Besides Anchor Glass, current employers include the international oilfield-services company Shawcor; Henryetta Pallet, a regional wood pallet manufacturer; and, G&H Decoy, a waterfowl decoy manufacturer since 1934.

Geography
Henryetta is located at  (35.442379, -95.985000).

Demographics

As of the census of 2000, there were 6,096 people, 2,460 households, and 1,589 families residing in the city. The population density was 1,009.8 people per square mile (389.7/km2). There were 2,844 housing units at an average density of 471.1 per square mile (181.8/km2). The racial makeup of the city was 79.69% White, 0.57% African American, 12.30% Native American, 0.33% Asian, 0.02% Pacific Islander, 0.79% from other races, and 6.30% from two or more races. Hispanic or Latino of any race were 2.20% of the population.

There were 2,460 households, out of which 14.8% had a female householder with no husband present, and 35.4% were non-families. 31.9% of all households were made up of individuals, and 17.3% had someone living alone who was 65 years of age or older. The average household size was 2.39 and the average family size was 3.00.

In the city, the population was spread out, with 25.9% under the age of 18, 8.3% from 18 to 24, 23.6% from 25 to 44, 22.5% from 45 to 64, and 19.7% who were 65 years of age or older. The median age was 39 years. For every 100 females, there were 86.3 males. For every 100 females age 18 and over, there were 80.1 males.

The median income for a household in the city was $20,115, and the median income for a family was $24,760. Males had a median income of $28,661 versus $14,268 for females. The per capita income for the city was $11,908. About 19.9% of families and 22.8% of the population were below the poverty line, including 29.8% of those under age 18 and 17.8% of those age 65 or over.

Government
Henryetta has a council-manager form of government with an elected mayor.

Transportation
Henryetta is at the crossroads of Interstate 40, being a major east–west interstate highway through the south-central portion of the United States, and U.S. Route 75, being a major north–south highway currently extending from Noyes, Minnesota on the Canada–United States border south to Dallas, Texas.  Henryetta is also served by US Route 266 and Oklahoma State Highway 124.

Henryetta Municipal Airport (FAA ID: F10), owned by the City of Henryetta, is located about 3 miles southwest and offers a 3501 x 50 ft. (1067 x 15 m) paved runway.

Commercial air transportation is available out of Tulsa International Airport, about 60 miles to the north.

Henryetta is served by the KI BOIS Area Transit System ("KATS"), a low-cost public bus/van service established in 1983 to help communities, primarily in southeast Oklahoma, by providing access to Senior Citizen centers, groceries, medical services, and jobs.  Their service includes transportation to Okmulgee and Tulsa.

Notable people
Henryetta is notable as the high school hometown of NFL Hall of Fame quarterback Troy Aikman. Other famous former and current residents include actress Alice Ghostley (Bewitched, Grease, Designing Women), Broadway actor Jeremy Hays  (The Phantom of The Opera, Les Misérables), as well as rodeo favorites Jim Shoulders and Terry Don West. It is the birthplace of Oklahoma Supreme Court Chief Justice Steven W. Taylor and Mark Ryal, former Major League Baseball player.

Events
Henryetta has two large annual rodeos, being the Jim Shoulders Spring Roundup Rodeo in June and the Living Legends Rodeo over Labor Day Weekend.

Parks and recreation
Just south of town is Nichols Park, developed between 1938 and 1941 by the Civilian Conservation Corps and the National Park Service, which is over 300 acres in size, and includes the 17 acre Nichols Lake offering fishing opportunities.

Jim Hall Lake, also known as Lake Henryetta, is 450 surface acres southeast of town. Amenities include boat ramps, docks, primitive campsites, picnic areas, and outdoor grills.

Lake Eufaula, Oklahoma's largest lake,  is to the east of town.

Historic locations
The Henryetta Historical Museum is housed in what was the town's first schoolhouse, and later what was the town's first courthouse.

The Henryetta Golf Course and Country Club was established in the 1920s.  It is open year-round and usually does not require advance tee-time reservations.

Both the Hugh Henry House on N. 3rd St., and Nichols Park located 1.9 miles south of the junction of Lake Rd. and Main St., are included on the National Register of Historic Places listings in Okmulgee County, Oklahoma.

Cultural
Both the Henryetta Free-Lance and TheHenryettan.com offer news services to the community. 

Henryetta was referenced as character Stevie Rae's hometown in P. C. Cast's book series, House of Night. Henryetta is mentioned in the King of the Hill episode "Harlottown" as Arlen's new city manager's prior town.

Henryetta's school teams were known for their unusual nickname, the "Mud Hens" (later "Hens" and "Fighting Hens"), until a student petition led to a name change (to "Knights") in 1989.

Henryetta is notable in its theatrical performances, most of which is done by the drama team of its local high school. A showcase of over 15 musical songs was performed in February of 2023, which was labeled "A success."

References

External links
 Encyclopedia of Oklahoma History and Culture - Henryetta

Cities in Oklahoma
Cities in Okmulgee County, Oklahoma
Tulsa metropolitan area
Sundown towns in Oklahoma